Caroline Elizabeth Means (born March 16, 1993) is an American retired soccer goalkeeper. Before announcing her retirement in 2018, Caroline played for Sky Blue FC, Seattle Reign FC and Orlando Pride in the National Women's Soccer League. She also represented the United States on the under-20, under-18, under-17, and under-15 national teams.

Early life
Born to parents David and Kelly Stanley, in Oklahoma City, Caroline grew up in Missouri and attended Lee's Summit North High School in Lee's Summit, Missouri from 2007 to 2011 where she earned two consecutive Goalkeeper of the Year awards from the Missouri State High School Soccer Coaches Association. She also played volleyball, basketball and track for the school.

She played club soccer for KCFC Intensity, the Scream and her childhood and first club team, the Pink Panthers. She won five state titles. Appeared in five Regional playoffs. And In 2011, she won a national tournament with KCFC, making three saves during a shootout to win the championship.

USC Trojans, 2012–2014
After playing one season for the University of Missouri, she transferred to the University of Southern California where she played for the Trojans from 2012 to 2014. During her first season with the Trojans, she started in 17 of the 18 games in which she played.  She made 95 saves allowing 32 goals. During her junior year, she started all 20 games and made 78 saves allowing 25 goals. Her senior year was by far her best in college. Appearing and starting in every game as a team Captain. She was the only senior to start. She set game records of most saves per match. And saved a PK against Notre Dame to beat them on the road.

Playing career

Club
Originally training with the Seattle Reign FC as an amateur player, Stanley signed with the team in July 2015. She made her first appearance for the club on August 1, 2015 during an away match against the Boston Breakers.

She signed with Sky Blue FC in March 2016.

After signing with the Orlando Pride following an injury to their backup goalkeeper Aubrey Bledsoe, she was substituted in for Ashlyn Harris early in the first half after Harris came down with a non-contact injury. This substitution happened one day after joining with her new club for the first time in Seattle, and she recorded several saves that contributed to a hard-fought road point against the Seattle Reign. On August 14, 2017, Orlando cut Means to make roster room for the return of Ashlyn Harris.

She officially announced her retirement from soccer on January 7, 2018 at age 24.

International 
She has represented the United States on various youth national teams at the under-20, under-18, under-17, and under-15 levels. She played at the CONCACAF U-17 World Cup qualifiers in Florida and saved a penalty kick to beat Costa Rica.

Post-Playing career
On February 27, 2018, Means announced that she had accepted the position as Goalkeeper Coach for the University of Tulsa Golden Hurricane Women's Soccer Team becoming the program's first full-time Goalkeeper Coach.

Personal life 
She is married to Baltimore Orioles pitcher John Means. They welcomed their first child, a son, in 2020. Means is a Christian.

Means is an ambassador for The Young and Brave Foundation, a non-profit organization that supports children with cancer.

References

External links
 Orlando Pride player profile
 USC Trojans player profile
 Pro Skills Soccer coach profile

Living people
1993 births
American women's soccer players
OL Reign players
National Women's Soccer League players
Soccer players from Missouri
USC Trojans women's soccer players
Women's association football goalkeepers
Missouri Tigers women's soccer players
NJ/NY Gotham FC players
Orlando Pride players